Raymond Jerry Peter Adduono (born January 21, 1947 in Fort William, Ontario) is a retired professional ice hockey player who played 221 games in the World Hockey Association.  He played for the Indianapolis Racers, Cleveland Crusaders, Minnesota Fighting Saints, and San Diego Mariners.

References

External links
 

1947 births
Living people
Canadian ice hockey centres
Canadian sportspeople of Italian descent
Cleveland Crusaders players
Hershey Bears players
Ice hockey people from Ontario
Indianapolis Racers players
Macon Whoopees (SHL) players
Minnesota Fighting Saints players
San Diego Mariners players
Sportspeople from Thunder Bay
Syracuse Blazers players
Western International Hockey League players